TGV is a limited edition 7 DVD set of archival footage of the English industrial band Throbbing Gristle. Included in this set were some of Throbbing Gristle's live performances, as well as rehearsals and short films. The release was limited to 2,000 copies and was initially only available direct from the band's website, but later some sellers were offering it online.

Contents
From 1979–81 shows at:
Oundle School
Recording Heathen Earth at the Industrial Records Studios, Martello St. London
Sheffield University
Rafters Club, Manchester
The Lyceum, London
Kezar Pavilion, San Francisco
From 2004–05:
A short film of the Cabinet Gallery Exhibition "TG24" by Andrew Wheatley
Rare footage of TG rehearsing at Mute Studios in February 2004.
The band's performance at the Astoria Theatre 2004
All Tomorrow’s Parties performance at Camber Sands 2004
Both performances from Turin, Italy 2005
Also:
Derek Jarman’s famous short film made as a tribute to TG: "Psychic Rally in Heaven" London
A full colour 60-page book with TG photos and texts from 1979 to 2005

References

2007 compilation albums
2007 video albums
2007 live albums
Throbbing Gristle compilation albums
Throbbing Gristle video albums
Live video albums
Self-released albums